Inganni is a station on Line 1 of the Milan Metro in Milan, Italy. The station is underground and is located in Via Angelo Inganni, within the municipal area of Milan.

History 
The station was opened on 18 April 1975 as part of the section between Gambara and Inganni. It was the terminus of Line 1 until 21 March 1992, when Bisceglie was opened.

References

Line 1 (Milan Metro) stations
Railway stations opened in 1975
1975 establishments in Italy
Railway stations in Italy opened in the 20th century